TGRT Haber is a nationwide TV channel in Turkey. It was founded on October 29, 2004, by İhlas Holding. It has a sister channel named TGRT Haber EU, which closed in circa 2011.

References

External links 
 
 TGRT Haber at LyngSat Address

Television stations in Turkey
Television channels and stations established in 2004
24-hour television news channels in Turkey